Declan McDonogh (born 21 January 1980) in County Meath is an Irish jockey who competes in Flat racing. McDonogh rode his first winner at Leopardstown Racecourse in June 1995 and has worked for trainers Kevin Prendergast, John Oxx and Joseph O'Brien . He was Irish flat racing Champion Jockey in the 2006 season.

Major wins
Ireland
 Phoenix Stakes - (1) -  La Collina (2011)
Pretty Polly Stakes - (2) - Polaire (1999), Rebelline (2001)
Tattersalls Gold Cup - (1) - Rebelline (2002)
Vincent O'Brien National Stakes - (2) - Kingsfort (2009), Thunder Moon (2020)

France
Prix de l'Abbaye de Longchamp - (1) - Maarek (2013)

References 

1980 births
Living people
Irish jockeys
Sportspeople from County Meath